Papias may refer to:

 Papias (admiral), Roman admiral in the 1st century BCE
 Papias, part of an ancient Greek sculptor duo with Aristeas (sculptor)
 Papias of Hierapolis, Greek Apostolic Father, Bishop of Hierapolis and author (c.60-c.130 AD)
 Papias (lexicographer), author of Elementarium Doctrinae Erudimentum (1040s)
 Papias (butterfly), a genus of skipper butterflies
 Papias (Byzantine office), office for eunuchs in the imperial palace administration